James Russell Lauderdale (born April 11, 1957) is an American country, bluegrass, and Americana singer-songwriter. Since 1986, he has released 31 studio albums, including collaborations with artists such as Dr. Ralph Stanley, Buddy Miller, and Donna the Buffalo. A "songwriter's songwriter," his songs have been recorded by dozens of artists, notably George Strait, Gary Allan, Elvis Costello, Blake Shelton, the Dixie Chicks, Vince Gill, and Patty Loveless.

Early life 
Lauderdale was born in Troutman, North Carolina, the son of Barbara Ann Lauderdale (née Hobson) and Dr. Wilbur "Chap" Chapman Lauderdale. Lauderdale's mother was originally from Kansas. In addition to her work as a public school and piano teacher, she was active in the Associate Reformed Presbyterian Churches in Troutman, Charlotte, and Due West, South Carolina, where she served as music director, church organist, and choir director. His father was born in Lexington, VA, the son of Reverend David Thomas and Sallie Ann Lauderdale (née Chapman). Lauderdale's father was a noted minister in the Associate Reformed Presbyterian Church. Lauderdale has one sister, Rebecca "Becky" Tatum, and a nephew, Mark.

He grew up in Due West, South Carolina. Both of his parents were singers. He too sang in his early years, and learned the drums at 11, the harmonica at 13, and the banjo at 15. He has cited the influence of Ralph Stanley and bluegrass music from an early age. He played a variety of music, including bluegrass, Grateful Dead, and folk in a duo with best friend Nathan Lajoie as a teenager.

During his childhood in Due West, many music acts would come to Erskine College. Lauderdale remembers enjoying the album Will the Circle be Unbroken by the Nitty Gritty Dirt Band and Neil Young's Harvest. He attended the Carolina Friends School in Durham NC and then went on to the North Carolina School of the Arts in Winston-Salem, NC, studying theater. He played in country and bluegrass bands during college.

Lauderdale is a long-time resident of Nashville, Tennessee.

Career 

After graduating from college, Lauderdale lived in Nashville for five months in the summer of 1979 while he tried to get a recording or publishing deal. He hung out a lot with Roland White, an accomplished mandolin player, with whom he cut a record. But things never took off, so he decided to move to New York, where he played in Floyd Domino's band and performed as a solo artist. In 1980 he met singer-songwriter Buddy Miller. He played in Miller's band in the active twang music scene that was evolving at the time.

During his time in New York City, he also worked in the mailroom and as a messenger at Rolling Stone magazine. He often was assigned to pick up and drop off photographer Annie Leibovitz's equipment.

Lauderdale joined the national touring production of Pump Boys & Dinettes, which eventually reached Los Angeles where he met musicians Rosie Flores, Billy Bremmer, Pete Anderson, Lucinda Williams, Dale Watson, and others. John Ciambotti became Lauderdale's manager and Lauderdale relocated to Los Angeles in the late 1980s, recording an album for CBS (which was later released as The Point of No Return). The record was influenced by the Bakersfield sound of Buck Owens.

Armed with a catalog of a few hundred songs he had written, Lauderdale was able to get a publishing deal with a small company called Blue Water Music (based in Houston, with a small office in Nashville). Living in Los Angeles he made a record with Anderson producing, but it was never released.

Lauderdale then got a publishing deal with Reprise and moved into the second floor of Buddy and Julie Miller's house until he got his own place in Nashville.

In 2013, Lauderdale started his own record label, Sky Crunch, so that he could release his many albums on a schedule that suited him.

In April 2018, Lauderdale signed to Yep Roc Records.

Solo career 

Lauderdale's solo debut, Planet of Love, was produced by Rodney Crowell and John Leventhal and released in 1991. Lost in the Lonesome Pines, a 2002 collaboration with Ralph Stanley, won the Grammy Award for Best Bluegrass Album. The Bluegrass Diaries won the same award in 2008. In 2003, Lauderdale was joined by roots/jam band Donna the Buffalo on the album Wait 'Til Spring. Could We Get Any Closer? was nominated for a Grammy in 2009.

In 2013, Lauderdale released Old Time Angels (a bluegrass album) and his first solo acoustic album, Blue Moon Junction, followed by Black Roses, with the North Mississippi All-Stars. Lauderdale appears on Laura Cantrell's 2013 release No Way There From Here. 2014 saw the release of his album I'm A Song. Lauderdale will release his new album Time Flies on August 3, 2018, along with Jim Lauderdale and Roland White.

Collaborations 
In 2007, he began a collaboration with Larry Campbell, the band Olabelle, and others in the American Beauty Project, a loose collection of musicians dedicated to reimagining in performance the Grateful Dead's two classic 1970 albums, Workingman's Dead and American Beauty.

In 2011, Lauderdale toured with Hot Tuna, an ensemble act that included Jorma Kaukonen, Jack Casady, Barry Mitterhof, G.E. Smith, and, for a time, Charlie Musselwhite. He has also toured with Elvis Costello, Rhonda Vincent, Mary Chapin Carpenter, and others.

Dr. Ralph Stanley 
Lauderdale wrote and produced two bluegrass records with Ralph Stanley. Their first collaboration, I Feel Like Singing Today, was nominated for a Grammy.

Buddy Miller 

Lauderdale released a record called Buddy and Jim with long-time friend and collaborator Buddy Miller in 2013. Lauderdale said they recorded it in three days in Miller's home studio. Miller did the mixing and producing.

Robert Hunter 
Lauderdale has often collaborated with Grateful Dead lyricist Robert Hunter.

Lauderdale's first collaboration with Hunter was Headed for the Hills and the second was Patchwork River in May 2010. The June 2011 release Reason and Rhyme was their third collaboration. Additionally, they wrote songs for a North Mississippi Allstars record that was released in the fall of 2013.

Two 2013 releases, Black Roses and Blue Moon Junction, were co-written with Hunter. Black Roses features North Mississippi Allstars' Cody and Luther Dickinson, whom Lauderdale met in Nashville at the Americana Music Festival, as well as Muscle Shoals musicians Spooner Oldham and David Hood. The album was recorded at their father Jim Dickinson's studio, Zebra Ranch in Mississippi.

2013's Blue Moon Junction features Lauderdale's work as a singer and songwriter, some of them co-written with Hunter in a solo, acoustic format. Lauderdale produced the record. Lauderdale says that they have more material that might make a good follow-up album, and hopes they will have time to collaborate again soon.

Nick Lowe 
Lauderdale said he worked on a yet-to-be-released record with Nick Lowe's band during a time he spent in England.

Roland White 

On August 3, 2018, Lauderdale released Jim Lauderdale and Roland White, a previously lost record made with mandolin master Roland White. The disc was recorded in Earl Scruggs' basement in 1979, and the songs were only found recently by White's wife.

The Jim Lauderdale Phenomenon 
The term "the Jim Lauderdale Phenomenon", coined by singer-songwriter Kim Richey and cited in an April 2000 article in The Tennessean by writer Peter Cooper, is an ironic reference to the fact that Lauderdale was nominated for a Grammy for his work with Stanley but was released from a record deal with RCA not long after. He was also released from contracts with Warner Bros., Columbia, and Atlantic Records. The article notes that many country artists that were signed to major labels in the 1990s failed to get radio airtime and had their contracts dropped after making one or two albums. The problem became endemic in Nashville during this period, when a lot of good music was being created and recorded, but the megastars dominated the airwaves.

Discography 
Lauderdale has had a long-time, successful Music Row career writing songs for many mainstream country music singers under four separate major-label record contracts: CBS, Warner/Reprise, Atlantic, and RCA/BMG.

Songwriting 
 Gary Allan: "Wake Up Screaming", "What's On My Mind", "We Touched the Sun"
 Mark Chesnutt: "Gonna Get a Life" (co-written with Frank Dycus) – hit No. 1 in 1995
 Elvis Costello: "I Lost You", "Poor Borrowed Dress"
 The Dixie Chicks: "Hole in My Head" (co-written with Buddy Miller)
Sara Douga: "I'll Forgive You if You Don't" from Joe & Gin (2020) (co-written with Sara Douga)
 Vince Gill: "Sparkle"
 Patty Loveless: "Halfway Down", "To Feel That Way at All", "You Don't Seem To Miss Me"
 George Strait:
 "The King of Broken Hearts", "Where the Sidewalk Ends" from Pure Country Soundtrack (1992)
 "I Wasn't Fooling Around", "Stay Out of My Arms" from Easy Come, Easy Go (1993)
 "Nobody Has to Get Hurt", "What Am I Waiting For" from Lead On (1994)
 "Do the Right Thing" from Blue Clear Sky (1996)
 "We Really Shouldn't Be Doing This" from One Step at a Time (1998)
 "One of You", "What Do You Say to That" from Always Never the Same (1999)
 "Don't Make Me Come Over There (and Love You)" from George Strait (2000)
 "Twang", "I Gotta Get to You" from Twang (2009)
 "Two More Wishes" from Honky Tonk Time Machine (2019)
 Lee Ann Womack: "The King of Broken Hearts"
 Blake Shelton: "What's On My Mind"

Albums

Singles

Guest singles

Music videos

Contributions 
A Town South of Bakersfield Vol. II (1988) – "What Am I Waiting For"
Happy Birthday, Buck! A Texas Salute to Buck Owens (2002) – "Sweet Rosie Jones"
Touch My Heart: A Tribute to Johnny Paycheck (2005) – "I Want You To Know"
Born to the Breed: A Tribute to Judy Collins (2008) – "Easy Times"

Other activities 
Lauderdale has hosted the Americana Music Awards since winning their first Artist of the Year and Song of the Year awards in 2002. He was a judge for the second, 10th and 11th annual Independent Music Awards to support independent artists' careers. He is Honorary Chairperson for the Chris Austin Songwriting Contest each April at MerleFest in Wilkesboro, NC.

He hosted "The Jim Lauderdale Show" on WSM Radio. He hosts, along with Buddy Miller, "The Buddy & Jim Show" on SiriusXM Outlaw Country. Lauderdale is also a frequent host and performer on "Music City Roots", a weekly Americana music show web-streamed live from The Factory at Franklin just outside Nashville.

Jim Lauderdale: The King of Broken Hearts 
A documentary film called Jim Lauderdale: The King of Broken Hearts, directed by Jeremy Dylan, was released in 2013. Using interviews with Elvis Costello, Buddy Miller, John Oates, Gary Allan, Tony Brown, and Jerry Douglas, the film describes Lauderdale's successes and failures as a recording artist.

References

External links 
 
 Jim Lauderdale: The King of Broken Hearts (documentary)
 Jim Lauderdale Interview at Reviewgraveyard.com

1957 births
Living people
Bluegrass musicians from North Carolina
American country singer-songwriters
American male singer-songwriters
Grammy Award winners
Singer-songwriters from North Carolina
People from Troutman, North Carolina
Associate Reformed Presbyterian Church
Country musicians from North Carolina
Yep Roc Records artists
Sugar Hill Records artists
Proper Records artists
Dualtone Records artists
New West Records artists